Donetske is an urban-type settlement in Kramatorsk Raion of Donetsk Oblast in eastern Ukraine. It belongs to Mykolaivka urban hromada, one of the hromadas of Ukraine. Population:

References

Urban-type settlements in Kramatorsk Raion